Augusto Giomo (3 February 1940 – 27 January 2016) was an Italian basketball player. He competed at the 1960 and 1964 Olympics and finished in fourth and fifth place, respectively. His younger brother Giorgio played for Italy at the 1972 Games.

References

1940 births
2016 deaths
Sportspeople from Treviso
Italian men's basketball players
1963 FIBA World Championship players
Olympic basketball players of Italy
Basketball players at the 1960 Summer Olympics
Basketball players at the 1964 Summer Olympics